Tedd Jasper Gullic (January 2, 1907 – January 28, 2000) was an outfielder in Major League Baseball. He played for the St. Louis Browns.

References

External links

1907 births
2000 deaths
Major League Baseball outfielders
St. Louis Browns players
Minor league baseball managers
Baseball players from Missouri
People from Oregon County, Missouri
People from West Plains, Missouri